Jinjo Crew (Hangul: 진조 크루,Hanja: 𨳌𤍒), is a South Korean b-boy crew formed in 2001. Jin (오를 진 𨳌) and Jo (불사를 조 𤍒) means 'Rising Fire (불살라 오르다) '. 
Jinjo Crew is famous for winning the world's top 5 major tournaments, including UK B-Boy Championships (2012), Freestyle Session (2011), Battle Of The Year (2010, 2018, 2021), R-16 Korea (2010, 2011, 2012), Red Bull BC One (2008).

Members

Former members

References

External links

Jinjo Crew Official Site
Jinjo Crew on Naver Blog

Jinjo Crew on V Live

South Korean dance groups
South Korean breakdancing groups